The Mabel Fincher School, at 2201 Morrie Ave. in Cheyenne, Wyoming, is an Art Deco-style building which was built in 1940.  It has also served as the Triumph High School. It was listed on the National Register of Historic Places in 2005.

It is a one-story L-shaped building.  It was designed by Frederick Hutchinson Porter.

References

School buildings on the National Register of Historic Places in Wyoming
National Register of Historic Places in Cheyenne, Wyoming
Art Deco architecture in Wyoming
School buildings completed in 1940
Buildings and structures in Cheyenne, Wyoming